Joseph Aidoo (born 24 August 1995) is a Liberian professional footballer who plays as a defender for the Liberia national team.

Career

Early career 
Born in Monrovia, Liberia, Aidoo arrived in the United States and began playing in the Philadelphia Lone Star youth system in 2006.

Philadelphia Lone Star FC
Aidoo made his top-tier league appearance in 2013 playing for Philadelphia Lone Star of the National Premier Soccer League for three seasons scoring a total of 13 goals from 35 appearances.

Uppsala Kurd FK
Ahead of the 2017–2018 season, he joined Swedish football club Uppsala Kurd FK.

Türkischer SV Oldenburg
On 1 January 2018, he joined the German Landesliga Web-Ems side Türkischer SV Oldenburg. He made his debut for the club away to SC Melle in a 2–1 loss on 18 February.

Llapi Besianë Podujevë
He signed a year deal with Kosovo Superliga club. Within a month, he opted for mutual termination of his contract after which he headed back to the United States.

Philadelphia Lone Star
Aidoo returned to his previous club Philadelphia Lone Star and signed a 12-month contract.

Michigan Stars FC
On 1 January 2019, Aidoo signed with Michigan Stars FC in the National Premier Soccer League on a free transfer. He established himself as a key player in the squad.

In 2020, Aidoo further extended his stay with Michigan Stars ahead of their first professional season in the National Independent Soccer Association Spring 2020. He made his debut on 29 February against California United Strikers.

International career
He made his international debut for Liberia on 22 July 2018 in a 0–0 friendly draw against Sierra Leone.

He made his second appearance for Liberia on 30 September 2019 in a 0–0 friendly draw against Botswana.

References

External links
 Profile at Flashscore
 
 Profile at NPSL

1995 births
Living people
Association football defenders
Liberian footballers
Liberia international footballers
Sportspeople from Monrovia
Liberian expatriate sportspeople in the United States
Expatriate soccer players in the United States
National Premier Soccer League players
National Independent Soccer Association players
Michigan Stars FC players